Yeganeh is a village in the Central District of Hamadan, Iran. It may also refer to:

 Yeganeh (name), list of people with the name
 Yeganeh Mahalleh, a village in Gilan, Iran